Silviu Lung (born 9 September 1956) is a retired Romanian football goalkeeper and current manager.

Playing career

Club career
Silviu Lung was born on 9 September 1956 in Sânmiclăuș, Satu Mare and started to play football in 1971 at Victoria Carei in Divizia C, being helped by a rule that the Romanian Football Federation imposed, which was the use of a junior player in the games from the lower leagues. He went to play Universitatea Craiova, making his Divizia A debut on 29 August 1974 in a 1–0 victory against Politehnica Timișoara. Lung went on to play 14 seasons with Universitatea Craiova, being part of the "Craiova Maxima" generation, helping them win two consecutive league titles in 1980 and 1981, at the first he contributed with only 3 appearances because he was diagnosed with hepatitis and at the second he played 20 games. He also won the Cupa României four times, in the years 1977, 1978, 1981 and 1983. Silviu Lung was an integral part of "U" Craiova's team that reached the 1982–83 UEFA Cup semi-finals in which he made 10 appearances in the campaign. In 1988, he joined Steaua București and won The Double in his first season, appearing in 29 Divizia A matches, also helping the club reach the 1988–89 European Cup final, playing 9 games in the campaign, including the final which was lost with 4–0 in front of AC Milan. After the 1989 Romanian Revolution, Lung went to play abroad at Spanish team, Logroñés where in his single season spent at the club, he played only 9 games in La Liga, having suffered a knee injury. In 1991, he returned to Romania, first at Electroputere Craiova, then at FCU Craiova with whom he won a cup and made his last Divizia A appearance on 24 October 1993 in a 2–0 loss against FC Brașov. Silviu Lung has a total of 419 Divizia A appearances and 58 appearances in European competitions, also in 1984 he was the Romanian Footballer of the Year and in the same year he was nominated for the Ballon d'Or.

International career
Silviu Lung played 76 games for Romania, making his debut under coach Ștefan Kovács on 21 March 1979 in a friendly which ended with a 3–0 victory against Greece. His following game was a 2–2 against Spain at the Euro 1980 qualifiers. His following appearance for the national team came after 3 years and a half of absence in a 0–0 against Italy at the successful Euro 1984 qualifiers in which he made a total of five appearances. He was used two games by coach Mircea Lucescu at the Euro 1984 final tournament in a 1–1 against Spain and a 2–1 loss against West Germany as Romania did not pass the group stage. He played 7 games at the 1986 World Cup qualifiers, five at the Euro 1988 qualifiers and another five at the successful 1990 World Cup qualifiers, being used by coach Emerich Jenei as captain in all the minutes of the four matches from the final tournament, as Romania got eliminated by Ireland in the eight-finals. Silviu Lung played four games at the Euro 1992 qualifiers and made his last appearance for the national team on 2 June 1993 in a 5–2 loss against Czechoslovakia at the 1994 World Cup qualifiers.

For representing his country at the 1990 World Cup, Lung was decorated by President of Romania Traian Băsescu on 25 March 2008 with the Ordinul "Meritul Sportiv" – (The Medal "The Sportive Merit") class III.

Coaching career
After retirement he began his coach career and for over 20 years was the assistant coach or goalkeeping coach for clubs like: FCU Craiova, Național București, Nagoya Grampus, Pandurii Târgu Jiu, Astra Ploiești, CFR Cluj, Universitatea Craiova or Concordia Chiajna. Between 1995 and 1997 he was the head coach of Minerul Motru and earlier in 1994, of Olympique de Casablanca, these were his only jobs as a head coach, until December 2017, when he was announced as the new head coach of Liga III side, CSO Filiași.

Personal life
Silviu Lung has two sons, Tiberiu and Silviu Jr. who played as goalkeepers and also represented Romania at international level. In January 2014, Silviu Lung was involved in a car accident which killed the driver of the other vehicle, receiving a punishment of one year and four months suspended sentence.

Honours

Player
Universitatea Craiova
Divizia A: 1979–80, 1980–81
Cupa României: 1976–77, 1977–78, 1980–81, 1982–83
Steaua București
Divizia A: 1988–89
Cupa României: 1988–89
European Cup runner-up: 1988–89
FC U Craiova
Cupa României: 1992–93

Individual
Romanian Footballer of the Year: 1984
Ballon d'Or: 1984 (22nd place)

References

External links
 
 
 

1956 births
1990 FIFA World Cup players
Association football goalkeepers
CD Logroñés footballers
CS Universitatea Craiova players
Expatriate football managers in Morocco
Expatriate footballers in Spain
FC Steaua București players
FC U Craiova 1948 players
La Liga players
Liga I players
Liga II players
Living people
People from Satu Mare County
Romania international footballers
Romanian expatriate football managers
Romanian expatriate footballers
Romanian expatriate sportspeople in Japan
Romanian expatriate sportspeople in Morocco
Romanian expatriate sportspeople in Spain
Romanian football managers
CS Minerul Motru managers
Romanian footballers
UEFA Euro 1984 players